The Betsy Ross Bridge, also known as the Ross Memorial Bridge, is a continuous steel truss bridge spanning the Delaware River from Philadelphia, Pennsylvania to Pennsauken, New Jersey. It was built from 1969 to 1974, and opened in April 1976, during the American Bicentennial Year. It was originally planned to be named as the "Delair Bridge", after a paralleling vertical lift bridge owned by Pennsylvania Railroad (which is now used by Conrail Shared Assets Operations and New Jersey Transit's Atlantic City Line), but was instead later named for Betsy Ross, a Philadelphia seamstress and reputed creator of the first American flag in 1776, making it the first automotive bridge named for a woman in America and the second bridge overall (after Iowa's Boone High Bridge was renamed the Kate Shelley High Bridge in 1912). 

Betsy Ross Bridge is located adjacent to the mouth of Frankford Creek.  During construction, thousands of headstones from historic Monument Cemetery were used as riprap on the embankments built for the bridge, some of which can be seen along the edge of the Delaware River near the bridge during low tide.

History

Construction began in 1969, and was completed in 1974. However, the bridge did not open to traffic until April 30, 1976 due to numerous problems with the communities where the bridge's ramps to and from Richmond Street were located. The problems (concerns over traffic, especially heavy trucks) were also related to the highway route's planned extension to the northwest from the Delaware River, across Northeast Philadelphia to connect with the Roosevelt Expressway. The cancellation of this extension, the planned Pennsylvania Route 90 (PA 90 - known as the Pulaski Expressway) resulted in the so-called "Evel Knievel" ghost ramps – with unfinished bridges and fly-over ramps, some of which were later constructed to serve nearby Aramingo Avenue in the city's Bridesburg section. Currently, the route serves as a high-level multi-lane (six lanes, separated by a concrete median barrier) bypass of the three-lane Tacony-Palmyra Bridge, which has a drawbridge on the span.

Construction in 1988 connected the bridge to New Jersey Route 90, allowing drivers to use Route 90 to access Route 73, rather than via U.S. Route 130.

Though originally constructed with eight lanes, the bridge was reduced to six lanes with two shoulders in 2000. The bridge is owned and operated by the Delaware River Port Authority.

When approaching the exits from I-95 in Philadelphia for this bridge, drivers see signs referring to NJ Route 90. The toll plaza (westbound tolls only) is 12 lanes wide, and since 2000 has been a participating E-ZPass facility.

Tolls
A $5.00 one-way toll is charged entering Pennsylvania for passenger vehicles (less than  gross vehicle weight). An $18 credit was previously given on a per tag basis for DRPA-issued E-ZPass tags that crossed one of the four DRPA bridges 18 times in a calendar month. This discount had been suspended in 2010 but was since reinstated. Trucks, commercial vehicles, mobile homes, and recreational vehicles (weighing at least  gross vehicle weight) pay $7 cash per axle. Seniors aged 65 and over can use a ticket program to pay $2.00 per trip (not integrated with E-ZPass).

Plans 
In 2011, the DRPA initiated the process of awarding an engineering contract to plan out the redecking of the bridge, as the concrete deck, its asphalt overlay, and the joints between the concrete have deteriorated after 35 years of service. Upon approval of the contract by the DRPA Board, the study is expected to take 30 months. No cost estimates or time frame for the actual redecking project have been announced.

With related improvements to Interstate 95 through Northeastern Philadelphia county, the Betsy Ross Bridge Interchange Project (Exit 26) was initiated in March 2015  to replace the decking on the ramps on the Pennsylvania side of the bridge and complete the access ramps to Aramingo Avenue.

See also

List of crossings of the Delaware River

References

External links
Delaware River Port Authority: Betsy Ross Bridge

Delaware River Port Authority
Bridges in Philadelphia
Bridges completed in 1976
Bridges over the Delaware River
Toll bridges in New Jersey
Toll bridges in Pennsylvania
Bridges in Camden County, New Jersey
Continuous truss bridges in the United States
Steel bridges in the United States
Road bridges in New Jersey
Road bridges in Pennsylvania
Pennsauken Township, New Jersey
1976 establishments in Pennsylvania
Bridesburg, Philadelphia
1976 establishments in New Jersey
Interstate vehicle bridges in the United States
Betsy Ross